Starourusovka is a rural locality (a selo) in Buzansky Selsoviet, Krasnoyarsky District, Astrakhan Oblast, Russia. The population was 142 as of 2010. There is 1 street.

Geography 
Starourusovka is located 44 km northwest of Krasny Yar (the district's administrative centre) by road. Buzan is the nearest rural locality.

References 

Rural localities in Krasnoyarsky District, Astrakhan Oblast